Sillé-le-Guillaume is a commune in the Sarthe department in the region of Pays de la Loire in north-western France, named after Guillaume de Sillé.

In the fifteenth century the lord of the manor was Sir John Fastolf of Caister in Norfolk (1380–1459), following the English conquest of Normandy and Maine.

See also
Communes of the Sarthe department
Parc naturel régional Normandie-Maine

References

Bibliography
 
 

Communes of Sarthe